Angaïs is a commune in the Pyrénées-Atlantiques department in the Nouvelle-Aquitaine region of south-western France.

The inhabitants of the commune are known as Angaïsais or Angaïsaises.

Geography
Angaïs is located in the urban area of Pau some 12 km south-east of Pau and 6 km south of Ousse. Access to the commune is by the D38 road from Ousse in the north-west passing through the town and continuing south to Baudreix. The D215 comes from near Assat in the west passing through the town and continuing south-east to Beuste. The D938 passes through the south-western corner of the commune and the D839 from Boeil-Bezing forms the southern border of the commune. The north-east of the commune is heavily forested for about 25% of the total land area with the rest of the commune outside the town area farmland.

Bus route 835 of the Interurban Network of Pyrenees Atlantiques from Bénéjacq to Pau services the commune.

The Lagoin river flows through the centre of the commune from south-east to north-west continuing to join the Gave de Pau near Pau.

Places and Hamlets

 Abérat
 Las Baches
 Bonnecaze
 Boué Bignes
 Las Clabades
 Coulat
 Grange de Cournac
 Lafont
 Grange Laraignou
 Le Moulin de Capbat
 Papus
 Pascal
 La Roque
 Turounet

Neighbouring communes and villages

Toponymy
The commune name in béarnais is Angais.

Brigitte Jobbe-Duval indicated that a possible origin of the name is the patronym Gaiz. She also mentioned that previously the people were nicknamed éleveurs de mules (Mule farmers). The breeding of these animals had been one of the most productive industries of the Nay plain and particularly of the commune of Angaïs.

The following table details the origins of the commune name and other names in the commune.

Sources:
Raymond: Topographic Dictionary of the Department of Basses-Pyrenees, 1863, on the page numbers indicated in the table. 
Cassini: Cassini Map from 1750
Ldh/EHESS/Cassini: 

Origins:
Homages: Homages of Béarn
Reformation: Reformation of Béarn
Assat:
Fors de Béarn
Census: Census of Béarn
Navarrenx: Notaries of Navarrenx

History
Paul Raymond noted on page 6 of his 1863 dictionary that the commune once had a Lay Abbey, vassal of the Viscounts of Béarn. In 1385 there were 4 fires in the commune and it depended on the bailiwick of Pau.

On 2 February 1617 Louis de Colom, lay abbot of Angaïs and a trustee of Béarn, made an important speech which united the Catholics and Protestants of Béarn to resist the king's wishes, and to oppose the execution of any act that may lead to political annexation of Béarn to France. Later in the same year the First Huguenot Rebellion occurred.

The Barony of Angaïs was created in 1656 by Louis XIV and consisted of Beuste, Ousse, and Sendets.

Isaac de Navailles appears to have been the first Baron, and Henri de Navailles-Labatut was Baron of Angaïs in the mid-19th century.

The Uzerte of Angaïs refers to a local phenomenon of plague that was documented in 1789.  The inhabitants of Angaïs stated that almost every year the plague was transported by very clear water - which rose above the village on the plain on the upper side of the wooded area - in April, May, and June. It caused fatal diseases in humans and animals. The poisoned water also harmed plants, such as maize, wheat, flax, grass, and vegetables in gardens.

Administration

List of Successive Mayors

Inter-communality
The commune is part of six inter-communal structures:
 the Communauté de communes du Pays de Nay;
 the AEP association of the Plain of Nay;
 the Sanitation association of Gave and Lagoin;
 the association for defence against flooding in the Lagoin basin;
 the Energy association of Pyrénées-Atlantiques;
 the inter-communal association for the construction of the CES of Nay;

Demography
In 2017 the commune had 889 inhabitants.

Economy

The commune is part of the Appellation d'origine contrôlée (AOC) zone of Ossau-Iraty.

Culture and heritage

Civil heritage
The Château of Angaïs (1908) is registered as an historical monument.

Religious heritage
The Parish Church of Notre-Dame (1845) is registered as an historical monument. Inside the church the Altar and Retable (17th century) in the south side chapel are registered as historical objects.

Environmental heritage
The Chemin Henri-IV borders the commune in the north-east. It is a walking trail that connects the Château of Franqueville to Bizanos near Pau at the Lake of Lourdes (Hautes-Pyrénées). It alternates forest trails with dirt roads and offers walkers panoramic views of the Pyrenees, the foothills, and the plains.

About 35 kilometres long, the route can be divided up between the various roads that it crosses. It is possible to go on foot, on horseback, or by bicycle but motor vehicles are forbidden.

Education
The commune has a primary school.

See also
Communes of the Pyrénées-Atlantiques department

References

External links
Angais on the 1750 Cassini Map

Communes of Pyrénées-Atlantiques